Zdzisław Bromek (born 18 November 1945) is a retired Polish rower who specialized in the single sculls. In this event he won eight national titles (1968–1974 and 1976) and finished in seventh place at the 1968 Summer Olympics.

References

1945 births
Living people
Olympic rowers of Poland
Rowers at the 1968 Summer Olympics
Polish male rowers
Sportspeople from Kraków